Tòng Thị Phóng (born 10 February 1954 in Sơn La Province) is a Vietnamese politician who is currently the Deputy Chairwoman of the National Assembly of Vietnam. She is a member of the 11th Politburo, in which she is ranked 11th.

Biography

References

1954 births
Living people
People from Sơn La province
Members of the 11th Politburo of the Communist Party of Vietnam
Members of the 12th Politburo of the Communist Party of Vietnam
Members of the 9th Secretariat of the Communist Party of Vietnam
Members of the 10th Secretariat of the Communist Party of Vietnam
Members of the 8th Central Committee of the Communist Party of Vietnam
Members of the 9th Central Committee of the Communist Party of Vietnam
Members of the 10th Central Committee of the Communist Party of Vietnam
Members of the 11th Central Committee of the Communist Party of Vietnam
Members of the 12th Central Committee of the Communist Party of Vietnam
Vietnamese communists
Tai peoples
21st-century Vietnamese women politicians
21st-century Vietnamese politicians